Lynda Nead  is a British curator and art historian. She is currently the Pevsner Chair of the History of Art at Birkbeck, University of London. Nead's work studies British art, media, culture and often focuses on gender. Nead is a fellow of the British Academy, the Royal Historical Society and of the Academia Europaea.

Biography 
Nead was elected as a fellow of the British Academy in 2018. She is a professor at Birkbeck, University of London, where she is the Pevsner Professor of the History of Art. She is a Fellow of the Royal Historical Society and of the Academia Europaea.

Work 
Marcia Pointon, in Art History, writes that Nead's analysis of women in Victorian imagery in her book, Myths of Sexuality: Representations of Women in Victorian Britain (1988), is based on the idea that sexuality and power are related to one another. Nead discusses a feminist history of the female nude in her book, The Female Nude (1992). Her survey covers representations of the female nude from Ancient Greece to the present. In her exploration of the subject, she also included studies on "vaginal imagery," "video pornography," and "visibility and the female body." In her book, she discusses the history of the female nude and how to decide where to draw the line between pornography and art. She also talks about how traditionally, the female nude "signifies the containment and disciplining of unruly female matter (and sexuality)," and also, how in a Kantian fashion, women's bodies represent a challenge of converting a troublesome nature into "pure art." Nead also discusses how feminist artists have resisted these traditions in various different ways. She further explores the use of women's bodies in art in her book about Chila Burman's work, Chila Kumari Burman: Beyond Two Cultures (1995).

In the art history book, Victorian Babylon (2000), Nead examines the gendered lives of people living in Victorian Era London between 1855 and 1870. Nead details different ways of living in urban London of the Victorian Era, looking at architecture and public spaces. She also examines maps, paintings, woodcuts and illustrations in the book. One chapter is devoted to maps of the sewer systems of London, for example, and how accurate maps helped create many of London's improvements. The Canadian Journal of History wrote that what Victorian Babylon "does best is to show how artists, cartoonists, illustrators represented" Victorian behavior. Art Journal describes her book as not only looking at behavior through art, but how things and people "circulate" throughout London during this time period. Art Journal also notes how Nead challenges the idea that women were "invisible" in Victorian England.

Within her art history book, ‘the female nude: art, obscenity and sexuality, Nead explored female nudity within art and how this is associated with modern-day concepts of female body image. There is also a comparison between the portrayal of a female body and how this has been sexualized by the artists. Giving examples of work from artists such as Albrecht Durer whose depiction of the female body symbolises femininity and sexualisation. The book describes how the paintings of females in galleries have influenced our current ideal of the female body.

Nead's book, The Haunted Gallery: Painting, Photography, Film c. 1900 (2007), examines film in Britain in the early twentieth century. The book covers not just the art of film, but how the moving picture helped shape society's perceptions of topics as diverse as sexual imagery to astronomy. The book itself contains a "wealth of beautiful illustrations" which help explain the various topics she explores.

In 2015, Nead curated an exhibit at the Foundling Museum, called "The Fallen Woman." The exhibit focused on the Victorian trope of the "fallen woman" who face difficult, morally ambiguous choices in society. Many of the "fallen women" were unmarried, single mothers who were often forced to give up their children to Foundling hospitals. Nead collected stories and art to create the exhibit.

Nead's 2017 work, The Tiger in the Smoke, she explores post-World War II London in conjunction with an event that took place in December 1952, where Londoners were subjected to a "horrendous" five day long fog that kept thousands inside. Nead discusses art, media and history through this context.

Selected bibliography

References

Citations

Sources

External links 
Faculty page
Birkbeck Voices 34

Living people
Year of birth missing (living people)
Academics of Birkbeck, University of London
Fellows of the British Academy
Fellows of the Royal Historical Society
British art historians
Place of birth missing (living people)
British women academics
British women historians
British curators
Women art historians
Members of Academia Europaea